All railway stations in South Sudan are on the Babonasa-Wau line, which was built from 1959 to 1962. During the Second Sudanese Civil War, the line was badly damaged and parts of the line were mined. It was fully restored in 2010 with funding of $250 million from United Nations.

Stations served by passenger trains

Proposed 
The Uganda Standard Gauge Railway will connect to Rwanda, South Sudan, and to the Mombasa–Nairobi Standard Gauge Railway whose construction is already underway. Nimule was selected as potentially being used as future Train station location.

Maps 
 UN Map
 UNHCR Map
 Interactive map of South Sudan railways
 KRC Map of Kenya

See also 

 Lamu Port and Lamu-Southern Sudan-Ethiopia Transport Corridor
 Transport in South Sudan
 Railway stations in Sudan
 Railway stations in Kenya

References 

 
Railway stations
Railway stations